Blake Windred (born 3 December 1997) is an Australian professional golfer. He won the 2021 Victorian PGA Championship and qualified for the 2023 European Tour by finishing second in the 2021–22 PGA Tour of Australasia Order of Merit.

Career 
Windred finished third at the 2018 AVJennings NSW Open as an amateur, and won the Avondale Amateur back-to-back in 2018 and 2019.

He turned professional in October 2019 and joined the PGA Tour of Australasia, where he made the cut in 9 of his first 10 tournaments. At the 2020 European Tour Q-School, he advanced through to Final Stage to secure playing privileges on the Challenge Tour for 2021, where his best finish was as runner-up at the Challenge de España in June 2021, one stroke behind Santiago Tarrío.

Windred achieved his first professional win in the first event of the 2021–22 PGA Tour of Australasia season, winning the Victorian PGA Championship. He was runner-up at the PGA Classic and runner-up again at the Golf Challenge NSW Open, one stroke behind amateur Harrison Crowe, collecting the  winner's cheque. He finished the season second in the Order of Merit, behind only Jediah Morgan, and as one of the top three receive a card for the 2023 European Tour.

In 2022, Windred accepted an invitation to the inaugural tournament of the LIV Golf Invitational Series at Centurion Club in the UK.

Amateur wins
2015 Jack Newton Srixon International Junior Classic
2018 Avondale Amateur
2019 Avondale Amateur

Source:

Professional wins (1)

PGA Tour of Australasia wins (1)

Team appearances
Amateur
Australian Men's Interstate Teams Matches (representing New South Wales): 2016, 2017, 2018, 2019

Source:

References

External links

Australian male golfers
PGA Tour of Australasia golfers
European Tour golfers
LIV Golf players
Sportspeople from Newcastle, New South Wales
1997 births
Living people